Post is a 1929 Soviet animated film directed by Mikhail Tsekhanovsky and N. Timofeev.

Plot 
The plot is based on an eponymous poem by Samuil Marshak. Marshak writes a letter to Boris Zhitkov who is travelling. The letter follows Zhitkov in various countries he travels through, but is always late, and Zhitkov only receives it when he is back in Leningrad.

References

External links 

1929 films
1920s Russian-language films
Silent films in color
1929 animated films
Soviet silent short films